Neusaß is a small hamlet in Baden-Württemberg, Germany, near Schöntal Abbey.

References

Villages in Baden-Württemberg